Cigaritis acamas, the tawny silverline, Arab leopard or leopard butterfly, is  a species of lycaenid or blue butterfly. It is found from North Africa and the Near East to India. The range includes Sudan, Arabia (United Arab Emirates) and Somalia. and it occurs on Cyprus.

The larvae are associated with ants of the genus Crematogaster.

Subspecies
C. a. acamas (southern Turkey to Iran, Syria, Lebanon, Israel, Jordan, the Sinai, Egypt, United Arab Emirates and probably northern Arabia)
C. a. bellatrix (Butler, 1886) (Sudan, southern Arabia, Somalia)
C. a. divisa (Rothschild, 1915) (Sahara, including Algeria)
C. a. dueldueli Pfeiffer, 1932
C. a. hypargyros (Butler, 1886) (eastern Arabia to India)

References

External links
 Dagvlinders van Europa

Butterflies described in 1834
Cigaritis
Butterflies of Asia
Taxa named by Johann Christoph Friedrich Klug